The Yarkent Khanate, also known as the Yarkand Khanate and the Kashghar Khanate, was a Sunni Muslim Turkic state ruled by the Mongol descendants of Chagatai Khan. It was founded by Sultan Said Khan in 1514 as a western offshoot of Moghulistan, itself an eastern offshoot of the Chagatai Khanate. It was eventually conquered by the Dzungar Khanate in 1705.

Capital 
Yarkent served as the capital of the Yarkent Khanate, which was also known as the Yarkent State (Mamlakati Yarkand), from the establishment of the Khanate (1514 AD) to its fall (1705 AD). The previous Dughlat state of Mirza Abu Bakr Dughlat (1465–1514) of Kashgaria also used Yarkent as the capital of state.

History

Background

The Khanate was predominantly Uyghur/Turki; some of its most populated cities were Hotan, Yarkent, Kashgar, Yangihissar, Aksu, Uchturpan, Kucha, Karashar, Turpan and Kumul. It enjoyed continued dominance in the region for about 200 years until it was conquered by the Dzungar Khan, Tsewang Rabtan in 1705.

In the first half of the 14th century the Chagatai Khanate had collapsed; on the western part of the collapsed Chagatai Khanate, the  Empire of Timur emerged in 1370, and became the dominant power in the region until its conquest in 1508 by the Shaybanids. Its eastern part became Moghulistan, which was created by Tughluk Timur Khan in 1347 with the capital centered in Almalik, around the Ili River Valley. It comprised all the settled lands of Eastern Kashgaria, as well as regions of Turpan and Kumul which were known at the time as Uyghurstan, according to Balkh and Indian sources of the 16th and 17th centuries. The reigning dynasty of the Yarkent Khanate originated from this state, which existed for more than a century.

In 1509 the Dughlats, vassal rulers of the Tarim basin, rebelled against the Moghulistan Khanate and broke away. Five years later Sultan Said Khan, a brother of the Khan of Moghulistan in Turfan, conquered the Dughlats but established his own Yarkent khanate instead.

This put an end to the dominance in the cities of Kashgaria of the Dughlat emirs, who had controlled them since 1220, when most of Kashgaria had been granted to the Dughlat by Chagatai Khan himself. The conquest of the Dughlats allowed the Yarkent state to become the foremost power in the region.

Reign of Sultan Said Khan

The reign of Sultan Said Khan was heavily influenced by the khojas. Said Khan also had a close relationship with Babur, his cousin and founder of the Mughal Empire across the Himalayas and Karakoram Range from the Yarkent Khanate.

Said Khan's reign included a campaign in Bolor in 1527–1528, a raid into Badakhshan in 1529, and looting expeditions into Ladakh and Kashmir in 1532. Sultan Said Khan purportedly died in 1533 at Daulat Beg Oldi of a high-altitude pulmonary edema while returning to Yarkent from an expedition into Ladakh and Kashmir.

Later Khans
Sultan Said Khan was succeeded by Abdurashid Khan (1533–1565), who began his reign by executing a member of the Dughlat family. Abdurrashid Khan also fought for control of (western) Moghulistan against the Kirghiz and the Kazakhs, but (western) Moghulistan was ultimately lost; thereafter the Moghuls were largely restricted to possession of the Tarim Basin.

Meanwhile, the Yarkent Khanate was conquered by the Buddhist Dzungar Khanate in the Dzungar conquest of Altishahr from 1678 to 1705.

List of rulers
List of khans of the Yarkent Khanate

Culture 
The collection of Uyghur Twelve Muqam

Gallery

Notes

References

Bibliography 
 Saray Mehmet, Doğu Türkistan Tarihi (Başlangıçtan 1878’e kadar), Bayrak Matbaacılık, İstanbul-1997
 Kutlukov M,  About foundation of Yarkent Khanate (1465–1759) , Pan publishing house, Almata,1990
 

 
Former countries in Chinese history
Mongol rump states